Foel Goch is a subsidiary summit of Esgeiriau Gwynion, and is included in a group of hills known as the Hirnantau. These hills rise from the south east shores of Llyn Tegid.

The summit is boggy and marked by a few stones.

References

Ysbyty Ifan
Mountains and hills of Conwy County Borough
Mountains and hills of Snowdonia
Hewitts of Wales
Nuttalls